Martin Jensen Linge,  (11 December 1894 – 27 December 1941) was a Norwegian actor who, in World War II, became the commander of the Norwegian Independent Company 1 (NOR.I.C.1) (pronounced as Norisen by the Norwegians), formed in March 1941 for operations on behalf of the Special Operations Executive.

Biography
Martin  Linge was born in Norddal, Møre og Romsdal County, Norway. In 1915 he graduated as a non-commissioned officer from the military school in Trondheim. He subsequently studied at the Trondheim Theatre (1917–1918). He debuted on the stage at the Central Theatre in Oslo in 1921 and appeared in both theatre and films during the 1920s and 1930s.

Martin Linge was father of Jan Herman Linge, an engineer and boat designer. He was also the grandfather of  Norwegian novelist Espen Haavardsholm, who wrote about his grandfather in Martin Linge – min morfar. Familieroman med fotografier  (Gyldendal norsk forlag. 1993).

Military career
Shortly after the German attack on Norway on 9 April 1940 he traveled to Åndalsnes to join his regiment. He had previously attained the rank of Lieutenant (in the reserve forces), and was also one of the first Norwegians to obtain a pilot's licence. When British troops landed at Åndalsnes from 17 April, Linge became liaison officer between the local regiment and the British. Åndalsnes (and other towns in Møre og Romsdal county) was at this time still unoccupied territory and the only port with railway connections to the East Norway and the campaign there. The King, the crown prince, the cabinet, Norway's gold and cash holdings, and finally general Otto Ruge with staff, escaped through Åndalsnes. Trygve Lie in his memoirs recalls meeting Linge at Åndalsnes. During German air bombing of a makeshift airfield at Setnesmoen, he was wounded and evacuated by boat to Britain. He was the first wounded Norwegian soldier to arrive in Britain.

Among exiled Norwegians, Linge along with Nordahl Grieg and Olav Rytter were the first to propose ideas for resistance against the German occupation. "Our land is perfect for secret resistance and guerrilla warfare" he declared in June 1940. In August 1940 he was appointed as liaison officer to the War Office and soon began recruiting men and organizing what became Norwegian Independent Company 1.

Linge was killed during Operation Archery, a British Combined Operations raid  at Måløy against German military positions on Vågsøy Island. During the Occupation of Norway by Nazi Germany, Måløy was used as a German coastal fortress, which had led to the eradication of all settlement on the island to make room for the fortress.  His body is buried at the Vestre gravlund (Western Cemetery) in Oslo.

Subsequently, the unit he had led was named Kompani Linge in his honor.  Linge Company was more formally known as Lingekompaniet (The Linge Company) ('-et' being the definite article suffix), by Norwegians. He was awarded Norway's highest military decoration for gallantry, the War Cross with sword.

Filmography
1926 - Vägarnas kung – Ola, a farm boy
1935 - Samhold må til –  Warden
1938 - Det drønner gjennom dalen – Policeman (Lensmannsbetjent)
1938 - Bør Børson Jr. – Nils Bækken
1939 - Gjest Baardsen –  Fisherman

Legacy
Martin Linge and his life are portrayed in the 1 hour documentary Martin Linge - skuespiller og legende (Martin Linge: Actor and Legend), which aired on NRK1 Fakta på Lørdag on 8 May 2004, produced by XpoMedia and Forsvarets Mediesenter (armed forces media center), directed by Mary Ann Myrvang and Runar Skjong, based on a concept, research, and script by Mary Ann Myrvang. Martin Linge is portrayed by the Norwegian actor Petter Næss in the 2008 movie Max Manus.

Memorials

Statue in the Linge park in Måløy
 Crown Prince Olav unveiled a memorial stone and plaque at the Linge farm in Norddal on 17 June 1946.
An oil field in North Sea is named after him. The oil field was previously named Hild.

Streets named in his honour
Kaptein Linges vei, Ålesund
Kompani Linges vei, Stavanger
Martin Linges vei, Snarøya
Martin Linges vei, Oslo
Martin Linges vei, Strømmen
Martin Linges veg, Moss
Martin Linges veg, Heimdal
Martin Linges gate, Haugesund

References

Other sources
Ford, Ken (2011)  Operation Archery - The Commandos and the Vaagso Raid 1942   (Osprey Publishing) 
Devins, Joseph H., Jr.  (1983)  The Vaagso Raid   (Bantam Books)

External links

Linge memorial at Måløy
Kompani Linge at Lofoten War Museum

1894 births
1941 deaths
Norwegian male stage actors
Norwegian male film actors
Norwegian male silent film actors
20th-century Norwegian male actors
Norwegian Army personnel of World War II
Norwegian Special Operations Executive personnel
People from Møre og Romsdal
Norwegian military personnel killed in World War II
Special Operations Executive personnel killed in World War II
Recipients of the War Cross with Sword (Norway)
Recipients of the Distinguished Service Cross (United Kingdom)
Burials at Vestre gravlund